Gom van Strien (born 10 June 1951) is a Dutch politician, he has been a member of the Senate for the Party for Freedom since 7 June 2011. He was second on the Party for Freedom list for the 2019 Dutch Senate election.

Van Strien was born in Geertruidenberg. He studied physics at the Catholic University Nijmegen between 1970 and 1976. He then studied business administration at the Technical Vocational Institute of Twente between 1976 and 1978. From his graduation until 1986 he worked for Statistics Netherlands, he then worked one year for Rijkswaterstaat and then started working for Utrecht University. At the university he was first secretary and later director of the faculty of veterinary medicine. From 2000 until 2009 he was general director of the Utrecht University holding company.

He was made Knight in the Order of Orange-Nassau on 21 February 2009.

References

1951 births
Living people
People from Geertruidenberg
Radboud University Nijmegen alumni
University of Twente alumni
Party for Freedom politicians
21st-century Dutch politicians
Members of the Senate (Netherlands)
Knights of the Order of Orange-Nassau